JS Hatsuyuki (DD-122) was the lead ship of the Hatsuyuki-class destroyers.

Development and design 

Adopting Japan's first all-gas turbine engine (COGOG), equipped with well-balanced weapons such as helicopters, C4I systems, and various missiles, it is inferior to Western frigate at that time. It has been evaluated as a non-escort ship. Twelve ships were built as first-generation general-purpose escort vessels in the era of eight ships and eight aircraft, they supported the escort fleet for a long time, but now they are gradually retiring due to aging.

In addition, there are many changes to training ships, and up to three ships have been operated in the training fleet as Shimayuki-class training ships, but the decline has begun with the conversion of Hatakaze-class destroyers to training ships.

The core of the combat system is the OYQ-5 Tactical Data Processing System (TDPS), composed of one AN/UYK-20computer and five OJ-194B workstations and capable of receiving data automatically from other ships via Link-14 (STANAG 5514).

This is the first destroyer class in the JMSDF equipped with the Sea Sparrow Improved basic point defense missile system. The IBPDMS of this class uses FCS-2 fire-control systems of Japanese make and one octuple launcher at the afterdeck. And in the JMSDF, OTO Melara 76 mm compact gun and Boeing Harpoon surface-to-surface missile are adopted from the ship of FY1977 including this class. Also, ships built in FY1979 and beyond carried Phalanx CIWS and were retrofitted to previous ships.

Construction and career 
She was commissioned into the Japanese Maritime Self Defense Force in 1982 and was decommissioned in 2010 with 28 years of active service.

After that, on February 24, 2011, she departed from Yokosuka for Dokai Bay for dismantling.

References

Hatsuyuki-class destroyers
1980 ships
Ships built by Sumitomo Heavy Industries